The Newborn Foundation is a Minnesota-based international 501(c)3 non-profit organization that advocates for newborn screening and works to develop and implement programs, technologies and policies that reduce infant mortality. The organization has played a part in the policy development, adoption and implementation of technologies for early detection, intervention and care of the youngest patients, including the addition of universal newborn pulse oximetry (CCHD) screening to the federal Routine Uniform Screening Panel (RUSP).

Background 

The Newborn Foundation is credited with persuading the United States Department of Health and Human Services to formally recommend universal pulse oximetry screening for congenital heart defects in every child born in the United States. Annamarie Saarinen co-founded the Newborn Foundation in 2010 after her daughter, Eve Saarinen, was nearly discharged from the hospital nursery with an undetected critical congenital heart defect (CCHD). Saarinen and co-founder Jim Bialick formed the Newborn Coalition, a 501(c)(4) non-profit organization in 2010 and launched the Newborn Foundation shortly thereafter to work on advocacy and policies in newborn screening and the deployment of medical technologies and health information technologies to reduce infant mortality and improve newborn health outcomes.

Since 2012, the Foundation has awarded the Hubert H. Humphrey "Dawn of Life” Award to four U.S. policymakers. It has also presented the R. Rodney Howell Award for Newborn Health, and the EVE Innovation Award for achievements in newborn screening, research, policy and technology.

BORN project 
After successfully implement policies in the United States, the Newborn Foundation launched the BORN (Birth Oximetry Routine for Newborns) project. The BORN project is a global health initiative that aims to bring affordable newborn screening resources, training, education and policy frameworks to resource-challenged settings and low and middle-income countries (LMICs).

The BORN Project was among the first joint commitments to the United Nations Secretary General's Every Woman Every Child (EWEC) initiative. Developed in partnership with Masimo, the project deployed the first mobile device enabled pulse oximeters to demonstrate the importance of newborn screening, scalable investment in early diagnostics and improved access to follow-up care for fragile babies. In September 2015, the BORN project was selected by the United Nations and the White House as one of 14 innovation projects to be highlighted during UN General Assembly as helping achieve the UN Sustainable Development Goals by 2030.

References

External links

Charities based in Minnesota
Health charities in the United States
Organizations established in 2010
Medical and health organizations based in Minnesota
2010 establishments in Minnesota
Infant mortality